The 2020 Georgetown Hoyas men's soccer team represented the Georgetown University during the 2020 NCAA Division I men's soccer season and the 2020 Big East Conference men's soccer season. The regular season began on February 16, 2021 and is set to conclude on April 10. It was the program's 69th season fielding a men's varsity soccer team, and their 25th season in the Big East Conference. The 2020 season was Brian Wiese's 14th year as head coach for the program.

Effects of the Covid-19 pandemic 
As a result of the COVID-19 pandemic, the Big East postponed the fall sports, with the hope of playing in the spring.

On November 4, 2020, the NCAA approved a plan for college soccer to be played in the spring.  The Big East announced their plans for the spring season in January 2021.

Squad

Roster

Schedule

Regular season

Postseason

Big East Tournament

NCAA Tournament

References

2020
Georgetown Hoyas
Georgetown Hoyas
Georgetown Hoyas men's soccer
Georgetown